The  is a traditional Japanese heating device. It is a brazier which is either round, cylindrical, or box-shaped, open-topped container, made from or lined with a heatproof material and designed to hold burning charcoal. It is believed  date back to the Heian period (794 to 1185). It is filled with incombustible ash, and charcoal sits in the center of the ash. To handle the charcoal, a pair of metal chopsticks called  is used, in a way similar to Western fire irons or tongs.  were used for heating, not for cooking. It heats by radiation, and is too weak to warm a whole room, often disappointing foreigners who expected such power.

Traditional Japanese houses were well ventilated (or poorly sealed), so carbon monoxide poisoning or suffocation from carbon dioxide from burning charcoal were of lesser concern. Nevertheless, such risks do exist, and proper handling is necessary to avoid accidents.  must never be used in airtight rooms such as those in Western buildings.

See also
 Brazier
 Japanese traditional heating devices:
 Kamado: a kitchen stove
 Shichirin: a portable brazier
 Tabako-bon: a mini brazier to light tobacco in kiseru pipes
 Kotatsu: a covered table over a brazier
 
 Chagama
 Tetsubin
 Japanese cuisine

References

Cooking techniques
Japanese pottery
Japanese cuisine terms
Stoves
Portable furniture
Japanese home